Tianjin–Qinhuangdao high-speed railway is a high-speed railway linking Tianjin and Qinhuangdao, Hebei. This railway is part of the Coastal corridor line of the National high-speed rail grid. It links up Beijing–Shanghai high-speed railway and Harbin–Dalian high-speed railway. The line opened on December 1, 2013.

High-speed railway lines in China
Rail transport in Hebei
Rail transport in Tianjin
Railway lines opened in 2013
Standard gauge railways in China